The Scout and Guide movement in South Africa consists of two independent national organizations:

 Girl Guides South Africa
 Scouts South Africa

See also
 Voortrekkers